Intelligent House Concept is a building automation system using a star configured topology with wires to each device. Originally made by LK, but now owned by Schneider Electric and sold as "IHC Intelligent House Concept".

The system is made up of a central controller and up to 8 input modules and 16 output modules. Each input module can have 16 digital (on/off) inputs and each output module 8 digital (on/off) outputs, resulting in a total of 128 input and 128 outputs per controller.

Module control protocol 

The central controller has one point-to-point data communication wire connected to each module. The protocol between the central controller and the modules uses a 5V pulse width encoding as follows:
 A header that is 4100µs high and 300µs low
 One pulse per I/O port, i.e. 16 pulses for input modules and 8 pulses for output modules
 One addition parity pulse; an even number of pulses is 0 parity and odd number pulses is 1 parity
 The pulse width is 600µs
 A 0 (input or output off, or even parity) is encoded as 300µs high and 300µs low
 A 1 (input or output on, or odd parity) is encoded as 150µs high and 450µs low

The above signal constantly repeats.

References 

 Smart Home Automation for Better, Smarter Living

Building automation
Home automation